Tomohiro Tanaka may refer to:

Tomohiro Tanaka (footballer) (born 1991), Japanese footballer
Tomohiro Tanaka (mixed martial artist), Japanese mixed martial artist